More Hank Snow Souvenirs is a compilation album by country music singer Hank Snow. It was released in 1964 by RCA Victor (catalog LSP-2812).

The album debuted on Billboard magazine's country album chart on April 25, 1964, peaked at No. 1, and remained on the chart for a total of 26 weeks.

AllMusic gave the album a rating of four stars. Critic Eugene Chadbourne wrote that there was "no 'yellow snow' amidst this material."

Track listing
Side A
 "Let Me Go Lover"
 "The Gal Who Invented Kissin'"
 "The Next Voice You Hear"
 "One More Ride"
 "Stolen Moments"
 "A Faded Petal from a Beautiful Bouquet"

Side B
 "Miller's Cave"
 "The Wreck of the Old '97"
 "Tangled Mind"
 "The Gold Rush Is Over"
 "Down the Trail of Achin' Hearts"
 The Change of the Tides"

References

1964 albums
Hank Snow albums
RCA Victor albums